Motomarine S.A. is a Greek shipbuilding company located in Koropi, Greece. It was founded in 1962 (originally as Lambro Boats by Aristotelis Zeis), and its range includes pleasure boats, as well as modern coastal patrol vessels. Motomarine has been for many years the main supplier of the Greek Coast Guard, while exporting its products to a number of countries around the world.

External links / References 
 
L.S. Skartsis, "Greek Vehicle & Machine Manufacturers 1800 to present: A Pictorial History", Marathon (2012)  (eBook)

Shipbuilding companies of Greece
Defence companies of Greece
Greek brands
Vehicle manufacturing companies established in 1962
Greek companies established in 1962